The Crooked River caldera is a large and ancient volcano that straddles three central Oregon counties. The volcano is considered extinct and last erupted about 29.5 Ma.

References 

Calderas of Oregon
Landforms of Jefferson County, Oregon
Volcanoes of Crook County, Oregon
Volcanoes of Deschutes County, Oregon
Volcanoes of Oregon
Oligocene calderas